Takuma (written: 拓磨, 拓真, 拓馬, 琢磨, 匠馬, 卓磨, 卓真 or 卓馬) is a masculine Japanese given name. Notable people with the name include:

, Japanese footballer
, Japanese baseball player
, Japanese motorcycle racer
, Japanese footballer
, Japanese footballer
, Japanese rugby union player
, Japanese footballer
, Japanese businessman
, Japanese footballer
, Japanese footballer
, Japanese martial artist
, Japanese boxer
, Japanese footballer
, Japanese baseball player
, Japanese footballer
, Japanese footballer
, Japanese footballer
, Japanese footballer
, Japanese photographer and critic
, Imperial Japanese Army general
, Japanese footballer
, Japanese shogi player
, Japanese footballer
, Japanese racing driver
, Japanese basketball player
, Japanese footballer
, Japanese footballer
, Japanese footballer
, Japanese voice actor
, Japanese voice actor
, Japanese voice actor and singer
, Japanese footballer
, Japanese badminton player
, Japanese economist

Fictional characters:
Takuma Aoi (青井 拓馬), a character in the film Battle Royale II: Requiem
, a character in the film series The Street Fighter
, Kyokugen Karate instructor in the "Art of Fighting" video games
Takuma Mamizuka (狸塚 拓馬), a character from the manga and anime School Babysitters, and the twin brother of Kazuma Mamizuka

Takuma (written: 宅間) is also a Japanese surname. Notable people with the surname include:

, Japanese mass murderer

See also
Takuma, Kagawa, a former town in Mitoyo District, Kagawa Prefecture, Japan

Japanese-language surnames
Japanese masculine given names